Washington County is a county in the U.S. state of Wisconsin. As of the 2020 census, the population was 136,761. Its county seat is West Bend. The county was created from Wisconsin Territory in 1836 and organized in 1845. It was named after President George Washington.

Washington County is part of the Milwaukee-Waukesha-West Allis, WI Metropolitan Statistical Area.

History
Washington County was created on December 7, 1836, by the Wisconsin Territory Legislature, with Port Washington designated as the county seat. It was run administratively from Milwaukee County until 1840, when an Act of Organization allowed the county self-governance, and the county seat was moved to Grafton, then called Hamburg. This solution was not satisfactory, as at that time four cities were vying to become the county seat: Port Washington, Grafton, Cedarburg, and West Bend. At least four inconclusive elections were held between 1848 and 1852, but the results were unusable due to accusations of foul play and serious irregularities. 

In 1852, the state Legislature attempted to split the county into a northern and southern half, with the northern half retaining the name and the southern half becoming Tuskola County. Voters refused this decision, so in 1853 the Legislature again split the county, this time into a western and eastern portion. The western portion remained Washington County, with West Bend as its county seat, while the eastern portion became Ozaukee County, with Port Washington as its county seat.

Geography
It is the fifth-smallest county in Wisconsin by total area.

Major highways

  Interstate 41
  U.S. Highway 41
  U.S. Highway 45
  Highway 28 (Wisconsin)
  Highway 33 (Wisconsin)
  Highway 60 (Wisconsin)
  Highway 83 (Wisconsin)
  Highway 144 (Wisconsin)
  Highway 145 (Wisconsin)
  Highway 164 (Wisconsin)
  Highway 167 (Wisconsin)
  Highway 175 (Wisconsin)

Railroads
Canadian National
Wisconsin and Southern Railroad

Buses
Washington County Commuter Express
List of intercity bus stops in Wisconsin

Airports
Hartford Municipal Airport (KHXF) and West Bend Municipal Airport (KETB) serve the county and surrounding communities.

Adjacent counties
 Fond du Lac County - northwest
 Sheboygan County - northeast
 Ozaukee County - east
 Milwaukee County - southeast
 Waukesha County - south
 Dodge County - west

Protected areas

 Ackerman's Grove County Park
 Allenton Marsh State Wildlife Area
 Goeden County Park
 Heritage Trails County Park
 Isadore and Lorraine Spaeth County Park
 Jackson Marsh State Wildlife Area
 Kettle Moraine State Forest (part)
 Leonard J. Yahr County Park
 Lizard Mound State Park
 Pike Lake State Park
 Sandy Knoll County Park
 Theresa Marsh State Wildlife Area (part)

Demographics

2020 census
As of the census of 2020, the population was 136,761. The racial makeup of the county was 91.7% White, 1.4% Asian, 1.3% Black or African American, 0.3% Native American, 1.1% from other races, and 4.2% from two or more races. Ethnically, the population was 3.5% Hispanic or Latino of any race.

2000 census
As of the census of 2000, there were 117,493 people, 43,842 households, and 32,749 families residing in the county. The population density was 273 people per square mile (105/km2). There were 45,808 housing units at an average density of 106 per square mile (41/km2). The racial makeup of the county was 97.69% White, 0.40% Black or African American, 0.25% Native American, 0.57% Asian, 0.03% Pacific Islander, 0.40% from other races, and 0.66% from two or more races. 1.30% of the population were Hispanic or Latino of any race. 59.9% were of German, 6.3% Polish and 5.5% Irish ancestry. 95.5% spoke English, 2.0% German and 1.7% Spanish as their first language.

There were 43,842 households, out of which 36.40% had children under the age of 18 living with them, 64.20% were married couples living together, 7.20% had a female householder with no husband present, and 25.30% were non-families. 20.30% of all households were made up of individuals, and 7.60% had someone living alone who was 65 years of age or older. The average household size was 2.65 and the average family size was 3.08.

In the county, the population was spread out, with 26.70% under the age of 18, 7.20% from 18 to 24, 31.50% from 25 to 44, 23.40% from 45 to 64, and 11.20% who were 65 years of age or older. The median age was 37 years. For every 100 females there were 99.50 males. For every 100 females age 18 and over, there were 97.00 males.

Communities

Cities
 Hartford (partly in Dodge County)
 Milwaukee (mostly in Milwaukee County and Waukesha County)
 West Bend (county seat)

Villages
 Germantown
 Jackson
 Kewaskum (partly in Fond du Lac County)
 Newburg (partly in Ozaukee County)
 Richfield
 Slinger

Towns

 Addison
 Barton
 Erin
 Farmington
 Germantown
 Hartford
 Jackson
 Kewaskum
 Polk
 Trenton
 Wayne
 West Bend

Census-designated place
 Allenton

Unincorporated communities

 Ackerville
 Addison
 Aurora
 Boltonville
 Cedar Creek
 Cedar Lake
 Cheeseville
 Colgate
 Diefenbach Corners
 Fillmore
 Hubertus
 Kirchhayn
 Kohlsville
 Mayfield
 Myra
 Nenno
 Nabob
 Orchard Grove
 Pike Lake
 Pleasant Hill
 Rockfield
 Rugby Junction
 Saint Anthony
 Saint Lawrence
 Saint Michaels
 Thompson
 Toland's Prairie
 Victory Center
 Wayne
 Young America

Public High Schools 

 East High School
 Germantown High School
 Hartford Union High School
Kewaskum High School
 Slinger High School
 West High School

The East High School and West High Schools share the same building but are separated.

The Slinger High School's Owls and the Hartford Union High School's Orioles have a rivalry, playing every year at the Coaches vs Cancer Game. Despite their rivalry they have a joint swim team.

Government
The County Executive is Josh Schoemann, a Republican who is the 1st County Executive, with the office having been established in 2020.

Politics
Like most other suburban counties surrounding Milwaukee (the "WOW counties"), Washington County is a Republican stronghold.  Since 1940, the county has been won by the Republican presidential candidate in every election except 1964, as is the case in neighboring Ozaukee and Waukesha counties. Additionally, John F. Kennedy, Lyndon Johnson and Jimmy Carter are the only Democratic presidential candidates since the 1936 election to have crossed the 40 percent mark. In 2008, while Barack Obama won Wisconsin by 14 points, Washington County, one of the 13 out of 72 counties to vote for his Republican rival John McCain was his weakest county in the state, as McCain won it by almost 30 points; and other WOW counties were the only three counties where Obama did not win 40 percent of the vote.

See also
 National Register of Historic Places listings in Washington County, Wisconsin

References

Further reading
 History of Washington and Ozaukee Counties, Wisconsin. Chicago: Western Historical Company, 1881.
 Quickert, Carl. The Story of Washington County. West Bend, Wis.: Author, 1923.
 Quickert, Carl (ed.). Washington County, Wisconsin: Past and Present. Chicago: S. J. Clarke, 1912.

External links
 Washington County website
 Washington County map at the Wisconsin Department of Transportation
 Washington County Convention & Visitors Bureau

 
1845 establishments in Wisconsin Territory
Populated places established in 1845